Cnaphalocrocis daisensis is a moth in the family Crambidae. It was described by Shibuya in 1929. It is found in Japan, where it has been recorded from Mount Daisen on Honshu.

References

Moths described in 1929
Spilomelinae